Plasmodium maculilabre is a parasite of the genus Plasmodium.

Like all Plasmodium species P. maculilabre has both vertebrate and insect hosts. In particular, P. maculilabre infects Mabuya maculilabris in the Congo basin.

Description 

The parasite was first described by Schwetz in 1931.

Geographical occurrence 

This species is found in Africa.

Clinical features and host pathology 

The only known host is the skink Mabuia maculilabris.

References 

maculilabre